The Township of Carden was a municipality in the north-west corner of Victoria County, now the city of Kawartha Lakes, in the Canadian province of Ontario.

Geography

Name
Sir John Colborne, Lieutenant-Governor of Upper Canada from 1830 to 1836 named the town to honour Admiral John Surman Carden 1771-1858 who embarked Sir John following the relief of Sir John Moore's army at Corunna in the Peninsula War.

Demographics
*Note that the following precise figures were rounded to the nearest 5 by Statistics Canada, and that percentages may have a small statistical error.

As of the census of 1996, there were 890 people, 335 households and 285 families in the township. The population density was 4.75 people per square kilometre (12.3/mi²). The racial makeup of the county was 100% Caucasian, with no permanent residents of a visible minority.

There were 335 households and 285 families, out of which 91.20% were married couples, and 8.80% were single parent families. 14.93% of households were made up of individuals. The average household value was $165,563.

The age distribution was 5.1% under the age of 4, 12.4% from 5 to 14, 10.7% from 15 to 24, 40.5% from 25 to 54, 12.9% from 55 to 64, and 18.0% 65 or older. The median age was 40.5 years. For every 100 females there were 108.2 males.

The median per capita income for the township was $21,667. Males had a median income of $28,007 versus $14,370 for females.

In the population over 25, 19.0% had less than a grade nine education. 54.8% had at least a high school diploma or equivalent. While 35.7% graduated from a non-university post-secondary institute, only 4.8% completed university.

Communities
Dalrymple
Carden (converted to Carden Alvar Provincial Park in 2014)
Horncastle (ghost town)
Rohallion

See also
List of townships in Ontario

References

External links
 Carden Plain Bird Sanctuary

Communities in Kawartha Lakes
Former township municipalities in Ontario
Populated places disestablished in 2001